Nedra is a lost 1915 silent film directed by Edward José and starring Fania Marinoff. It was produced and distributed by Pathé Exchange.

Cast
George Probert - Hugh Ridgway
Fania Marinoff - Lady Tenny
Margaret Greene - Grace Vernon
Crauford Kent - Henry Veath

References

External links
 Nedra at IMDb.com

1915 films
American silent feature films
Lost American films
American black-and-white films
Pathé Exchange films
Films directed by Edward José
Silent American drama films
1915 drama films
1915 lost films
Lost drama films
1910s American films